Battle of Al-Anbar was between the Muslim Arab army under the command of Khalid ibn al-Walid and the Sasanian Empire. The battle took place at Anbar which is located approximately 80 miles from the ancient city of Babylon. Khalid besieged the Sassanian Persians in the city fortress, which had strong walls. Scores of Muslim archers were used in the siege. The Persian governor, Shirzad, eventually surrendered and was allowed to retire.  The Battle of Al-Anbar is often remembered as the "Action of the Eye" since Muslim archers used in the battle were told to aim at the "eyes" of the Persian garrison.

References

Sources
 A.I. Akram, The Sword of Allah: Khalid bin al-Waleed, His Life and Campaigns, Nat. Publishing. House, Rawalpindi (1970) .

Battles of Khalid ibn Walid
Battles involving the Rashidun Caliphate
Battles involving the Sasanian Empire
Muslim conquest of Mesopotamia
633
630s in the Rashidun Caliphate